Line 8 is a north-south line of the Shanghai Metro network. The line is colored cyan on system maps.

History
The second phase, from Yaohua Road to  began operation on July 5, 2009.

Two stations opened later than the rest of the line:  in September 2012 and  opened in April 2011.

It will use rubber tire Bombardier Innovia APM 300 technology. On January 13 Bombardier delivered the first out of 44 autonomous people movers to Shanghai. It opened on March 31, 2018.

Controversy

Even though Line 8 is a heavy rail rapid transit line, "Type C" trains designed for light metro lines consisting of 6 or 7 cars are being used throughout the line. Due to the trains relatively smaller loading gauge and capacity compared to "Type A" trains used on other Shanghai Metro lines, the line is extremely crowded. This has caused much doubt among the public in Shanghai Metro's ability to accurately predict passenger flows for future lines. It was revealed that Line 8 originally was forecasted to have a short term daily ridership of 400,000-500,000 people/day, which warrants the use of larger "Type A" trains on other Shanghai Metro lines. This is not surprising given Line 8 is planned to serve some of Shanghai's densest neighborhoods and several major attractions. However the forecast was revised many times and finally downgraded to 200,000 people/day through "internal negotiation and coordination", which allowed Shanghai Alstom, a company interested in manufacturing and selling "Type C" trains in Shanghai, to build trains for Line 8. Chief designer Yu Jiakang noted that in addition to short term solutions such as operating 7 car trains and reducing headways, last resort is to rebuild Line 8 as the loading gauges of "Type A" trains are incompatible with "Type C" trains. Additionally, parallel relief bus services have started operating. The initial 28 trainsets were 6-car consists. Due to overcrowding, subsequent train purchases (62 sets) were 7-car sets.

Stations

Service routes

Important stations
 - At this station, passengers can transfer to line 3. Previously they must exit and re-enter the station, but a new linkway has been built via the shopping center.
 - Passengers can interchange to lines 1 and 2. This is also a very important station, as it is located at a major financial district as well as near many tourist attractions.
: The first platform to platform interchange station in the Shanghai Metro network. Interchange with line 4.

Future expansion
There are no planned expansions.

Station name change
 On May 7, 2011, Jiyang Road was renamed .
 On June 9, 2013, the Aerospace Museum was renamed .

Headways 
<onlyinclude>
<onlyinclude>
<onlyinclude>

Technology

Signalling
From June 19 to July 1, 2009, during the second phase of line 8 signal commissioning (upgrade from fully manual driving to CBTC semi-automatic driving), the first phase of operation efficiency was unstable, and trains stopped frequently. As a result, the driving time was much longer than normal, resulting in passenger congestion and seven consecutive large-scale failures. After investigation by the Shanghai Metro, it was found that the main reason for the stoppage of the train on Line 8 was that the communication transmission time set by the CBTC on-board software was too short, which caused the train to transmit too much data to the central computer, and the train was unable to accurately receive wireless signals. On July 2, 2009, after all the on-board software of the train was updated to resolve this issue.

Rolling Stock
The designed speed of the train is 80 km/h, the length is 19.49 meters (Tc)/19.44 meters (Mp, M) (compare to longer, more common Type A carriages at 23 meters), and the width is 2.6 meters (Type A carriages are wider at 3.0 meters).

References 

Shanghai Metro lines
 
Railway lines opened in 2007
2007 establishments in China